The 2022 Broxbourne Borough Council election took place on 5 May 2022 to elect members of the Broxbourne Borough Council in England. This was on the same day as other local elections.

Results summary

Ward results

Broxbourne & Hoddesdon South

Cheshunt North

Cheshunt South & Theobalds

Flamstead End

Goffs Oak

Hoddesdon North

Hoddesdon Town & Rye Park

Rosedale & Bury Green

Waltham Cross

Wormley & Turnford

References

Broxbourne
Broxbourne Borough Council elections